Utopic Software, formerly Persystent Software, is a privately held computer software company with offices in Tampa, Florida, USA, specializing in automated PC repair, self-healing operating system repair, imaging and secure hard drive wipe.
Utopic Software acquired Persystent Technologies in 2012. Utopic retained the Persystent brand and rebuilt the solution as a cohesive and centralized suite of features.

Utopic Software developed patented technology that restores application and operating system (O/S) files in as little as 45 seconds. The product is called Persystent Suite for Windows-based PCs. The PC repair technology can be automated to perform repair upon each reboot or it can be managed on demand for more flexibility.

References

Notes

 

 

 

 

 

Software companies based in Florida
Companies based in Tampa, Florida
Software companies of the United States